Norman David MacKay (15 November 1890 – 15 June 1965) was an  Australian rules footballer who played with Geelong in the Victorian Football League (VFL).

Notes

External links 

1890 births
1965 deaths
Australian rules footballers from Geelong
Geelong Football Club players
Chilwell Football Club players